was a Japanese actor and comedian.

Biography
Komatsu was born in Fukuoka on January 10, 1942. He died of hepatocellular carcinoma (liver cancer) at a hospital in Tokyo on December 7, 2020. He was 78 years old.

Selected filmography

Films
Kaiju funsen–Daigoro tai Goriasu (1972)
Pink Lady no Katsudō Daishashin (1978)
Station (film) (1981)
Izakaya Chōji (1983)
University of Laughs (2004)
Journey to the Shore (2015)
The Pledge to Megumi (2021)

Television
Hissatsu Shiokiya Kagyō  (1975) as Mamekichi
Edo no Uzu  (1978)
Ōedo Sōsamō (1990–91), Rokusuke
Sōrito Yobanaide (1997)
Ōoka Echizen (1991–99)

Japanese dub
ALF (1986–90), Willie Tanner (Max Wright)
The Nude Bomb (1988 TV Asahi edition), Maxwell Smart (Don Adams)

References

External links

NHK人物録　小松政夫/Masao Komatsu

1942 births
2020 deaths
Japanese male actors
Japanese comedians